Huai Yap is a village and tambon (subdistrict) of Ban Thi District, in Lamphun Province, Thailand. In 2005 it had a population of 8111 people. The tambon contains 15 villages.

References

Tambon of Lamphun province
Populated places in Lamphun province